This is a list of seasons played by Arminia Bielefeld in German football, from their first competitive to the most recent completed season. It details the club's achievements in major competitions, and the top scorers for each season.

The club was formed on 3 May 1905 as 1. Bielefelder Fußballclub (BFC) Arminia. The Fußballclub Siegfried Bielefeld joined Arminia two years later. On 7 July 1919, Arminia merged with the Bielefelder Turngemeinde 1848 and became known as Turngemeinde Arminia Bielefeld. However, this merger was not successful and had to declare bankruptcy on 20 October 1922. The 1. BFC Arminia was reestablished on 6 November 1922 and was renamed into the current name, Deutscher Sportclub Arminia Bielefeld, on 30 January 1926.

Seasons

until 1933

from 1933

Key

W = Matches won
D = Matches drawn
L = Matches lost
GF = Goals for
GA = Goals against
Pts = Points
Pos = Final position

Name in bold indicates the league's top scorer.

NH = Not held
DNQ = Did not qualify
R1 = Round 1
R2 = Round 2
R3 = Round 3
R4 = Round 4
QF = Quarter-finals 
SF = Semi-finals

Footnotes

Sources 
 
 

Seasons
Arminia Bielefeld
Arminia Bielefeld